Robert Jackson Williams (born July 19, 1978) is an American media and Internet entrepreneur, and former child actor. He is the founder of the media company Young Hollywood.

Early life and education
RJ Williams was born in Los Angeles, California, United States in 1978. He was educated at the Crossroads School for Arts and Sciences in Santa Monica, and attended film school at the University of Southern California.

Acting career
Williams was a child actor on films and television shows, one of his credits being the child character Rowdy for two seasons of General Hospital, for which he became a winner of the Young Artist Award for best Actor in a Daytime Series for his role in General Hospital at the 12th annual Youth In Film Awards.
He also played Thomas Magnum as a child in the 1983 episode of Magnum P.I., Home From the Sea.
Additionally, he was the voice of the title cartoon bear Kissyfur, which started in 1986. He also guest starred in a few episodes of Full House and an episode of Star Trek: the Next Generation (The Child in 1988). In addition he appeared on a few episodes of “Punky Brewster”. In the early 1990s, Williams provided the voice of Kit Cloudkicker in the animated show TaleSpin, and for Cavin in the final season of Disney's Adventures of the Gummi Bears.  He also played the boy whose friend was a robot on the 1990s syndicated children's TV show Wake, Rattle and Roll, a daily syndicated interview show that ran for 130 episodes.  Once Wake, Rattle and Roll stopped producing episodes, Williams decided to take a hiatus from show business to attend both Crossroads High School, and the film school at University of Southern California (USC).

In 2004, Williams worked alongside NSYNC's Lance Bass and together they co-hosted a one-hour, primetime American Music Awards Pre-Show with Dick Clark Productions and ABC

Business Ventures

Young Hollywood
RJ Williams is the founder of digital video platform Young Hollywood. The company creates and distributes celebrity and lifestyle programming globally; owns several leading entertainment brands, and licenses the Young Hollywood trademark internationally for a range of consumer products and services.

The company has partnered with Yahoo, Hulu, Google, TV Guide, Blinkx, Metacafe, and YouTube which selected Young Hollywood to be their partner for their first ever live streaming project.  It began with pro skater Tony Hawk, comedian Dane Cook and "Jackass" star Steve-O.

Williams built a broadcast studio at the Four Seasons Hotel in Beverly Hills. and launched a new network in partnership with Google (YHN).  YouTube spent 100 million dollars on launching this venture   In June 2012, Williams was the subject of a cover story on BBC World News about the 100 Million dollar initiative and Young Hollywood's key role in it.  The Young Hollywood Network has become a “barker channel” for other new YouTube channels — like a Leno for the YouTube set introducing audiences to other YouTube stars.

Recent partnerships include Apple, Google, Roku, Amazon and Microsoft. Williams also announced plans to launch Young Hollywood TV, a streaming celebrity focused digital network built for Millennials.   The network produces more than 500 original hours of exclusive programming annually. Plans were also announced to expand into several new content verticals including reality and scripted programming and to heavily invest in their own IP, as well as work with outside talent and creators, to continue to expand content offerings.

Media career
Williams works closely advising several brands including Coca-Cola, Samsung, AT&T, Unilever, Subway, Rayban, Intuit and Electronic Arts on content production, product integration, experiential marketing and maximizing their social reach. He is known for paving the way by being one of the first to utilize new technologies such as what he did with programmatic advertising and creating PMP’S 

RJ has been profiled in media such as Wall Street Journal, Forbes, Ad Week, Ad Age, BBC World News, USA Today and was named to The Hollywood Reporter Power 50 list joining the top execs from such places as Facebook, Twitter, Hulu, YouTube and Netflix. It was said that "Everything Young Hollywood Founder and CEO RJ Williams does is counterintuitive and effective"    Fast Company recently included  Williams on their list of   "today's most innovative business thought leaders" joining Starbucks CEO Howard Schultz, Foursquare CEO  Dennis Crowley,  Zynga CEO Mark Pincus,  Legendary CEO Thomas Tull, and Tumblr CEO David Karp.

RJ Williams is represented by the Creative Artists Agency.

Producing
After graduation from USC, Williams formed a production company, Arjay Productions which focused on celebrity and lifestyle programming. Between 2003-2006, his company went on to produce multiple specials and series that were distributed by Showtime Networks. RJ was the creator, host and executive producer of these shows.

References

External links
 
 

1978 births
20th-century American male actors
American chief executives
American company founders
American male child actors
American male film actors
American male television actors
American male voice actors
Businesspeople from Los Angeles
Crossroads School alumni
Living people
Male actors from Los Angeles
University of Southern California alumni